Carlina salicifolia is a species of thistle found in Macaronesia.

Description
Low shrubby perennial to 1 m. Stems branched, white-tomentose in the upper parts and with prominent leaf-scars. Leaves alternate, entire, deciduous but long persistent after withering, crowded towards the ends of the branches, 6–10 cm x 6–15 mm, lanceolate, coriaceous, green and glabrescent above, densely white tomentose beneath, subsessile and with a few ciliate spines at the base. Capitulum 15–30 mm in diameter (excluding outer bracts), discoid to hemispherical on short peduncles solitary or in corymbs. Outer involucral bracts large, leafy of varying lengths, lanceolate to ovate, the inner scarious, shiny, stiff and spreading when dry. Inner involucral bracts shorter than the outer, scarious, recurved, spiny at the apex, blackish or purplish brown . Receptacle flat, scales persistent divided into linear segments, bristles also sometimes present, often tipped with red. Florets creamy yellow, hermaphrodite, all with a tubular 5-lobed corolla, ray florets absent. Achenes oblong 3 mm, pappus of 1 row of plumose, dense,  appressed, caduceus, shiny brown hairs 2- to 3- branched and united at the base into clusters. Fl. V-VIII.

Distribution
In Madeira throughout much of the island on cliffs and rocky slopes; also on Porto Santo and on the Desertas. Also in all of the Canary Islands where it is frequent on cliffs in the upper xerophytic and forest zones 200–1600 m. Very rare on Lanzarote found in the Famara mountain range  and on Fuerteventura found in the Jandia area which covers the southwestern mountainous part of the island.

References

 Wild Flowers of the Canary Islands by David Bramwell MSc., PhD., and Zoe I. Bramwell BSc. 1974, Stanley Thornes (Publishers) Ltd. London and Burford. 
 Press, J. R. and M. J. Short. Flora of Madeira. Natural History Museum, UK. 1994. .

External links
 http://www.floradecanarias.com/carlina_salicifolia.html
 http://www.fotohanc.com/displayimage.php?album=35&pos=16
 http://www.biologie.uni-regensburg.de/Botanik/Schoenfelder/kanaren/images/Carlina_salicifolia.jpg
 http://www.stridvall.se/flowers/gallery/Asteraceae_3?page=12
 http://www.planetefleurs.fr/Systematique/Asteraceae/Carlina_salicifolia.htm
 http://www.floralanzarote.com/index.php/endemicas/lanzarote-y-fuerteventura/129-carlina-salicifolia 
 
 http://plantasdemitierra.blogspot.no/2007/05/carlina-salicifolia.html

salicifolia
Flora of Madeira
Flora of the Canary Islands
Endemic flora of Macaronesia